Assin South District is one of the twenty-two districts in Central Region, Ghana. Originally it was formerly part of the then-larger Assin District in 1988, until the southern part of the district was split off to create Assin South District on 18 February 2004; thus the remaining part has been renamed as the first Assin North District, with Assin Fosu as its capital town (which it was later elevated to municipal district assembly status on 29 February 2008 to become Assin North Municipal District, and later the southern part of the district was split off to create the present Assin North District on 15 March 2018). The district assembly is located in the northwest part of Central Region and has Nsuaem Kyekyewere as its capital town.

Populated places
Other popular towns in the district include: Assin Darmang, Fante Nyankumasi and Assin Jakai.

List of settlements

Sources

References

Central Region (Ghana)

Districts of the Central Region (Ghana)